The 2018 ASEAN Women's T20 Open Tournament was a women's Twenty20 (T20) cricket tournament held in Thailand from 6 to 13 March 2018. The six participating teams were the women's national sides of Bhutan, Hong Kong, Indonesia, Malaysia, Tanzania and hosts Thailand. The matches were all played at the Terdthai Cricket Ground in Bangkok. Matches did not have Twenty20 International status, as the tournament was played a few months before the International Cricket Council's decision to grant full Twenty20 International status to all its members came into effect from 1 July 2018 for women's teams. 

The hosts won the round-robin tournament with a perfect record of five wins from five matches, while Tanzania finished as runners-up.

Squads

Points table

Matches

References

External links
 Series home at ESPN Cricinfo

International cricket competitions in 2017–18
International cricket competitions in Thailand